Malonyl chloride is the organic compound with the formula CH2(COCl)2. It is the acyl chloride derivative of malonic acid. It is a colorless liquid although samples are often deeply colored owing to impurities. The compound degrades at room temperature after a few days. It used as a reagent in organic synthesis.

Synthesis and reactions
Malonyl chloride can be synthesized from malonic acid in thionyl chloride. As a bifunctional compound, it is used in the preparation of a number of cyclic compounds by diacylation. Heating in the presence of non-nucleophilic base gives the ketene derivative O=C=C(H)COCl.

References

Acyl chlorides